Kulstadholmane ( or Kulstad Islets) is the southernmost group of islets in Thousand Islands, an archipelago south of Edgeøya. It comprises Håøya and the skerries or islets surrounding it: Håungen, Håkallen and Håkjerringa. The islets are named after the Norwegian sealing skipper Johan Kulstad, who was shipwrecked in Storfjorden in 1853 before being rescued by the Danish skipper Schau.

References 

 Norwegian Polar Institute Place Names of Svalbard Database

Islands of Svalbard